Señorita Panamá 2002 was the 20th Anniversary of the Señorita Panamá pageant  which started in 1982  and 37th celebration of the Miss Panama contest,  The event was held at the Vasco Núñez Convention Center of the Hotel Panamá, Ciudad de Panamá, on Friday 6, September 2002.

The pageant was broadcast on RPC-TV Channel 4 on September 16. 14 contestants from all over Panama competed for the prestigious crown. At the conclusion of the final night of competition, outgoing titleholder Justine Pasek Panama Centro who became later Miss Universe 2002 crowned Stefanie de Roux of  Panama Centro as the new Señorita Panamá.

In the same night was celebrated the election of the "Señorita Panamá World",  was announced the winner of the Señorita Panamá Mundo title. Señorita Panamá World 2001 Lourdes Cristina González Montenegro of Los Santos crowned Yoselín Sánchez Espino of Los Santos  as the new Señorita Panamá World.

De Roux competed in the Miss Universe 2003 pageant, held at the Figali Convention Center, Panama City, Panama on June 3, 2003. She placed among the Top 15 semi finalists.
In other hands Sánchez competed in Miss World 2002, the 52nd edition of the Miss World pageant, was held on 7 December 2002 at the Alexandra Palace in London, United Kingdom.

Final Result

Special awards

Judges
 María Elena Berberían, TV Presenter.
 Giovanni Spirito, hairstylist.
 Liriola Pittí, Minister of Tourism.
 José Miguel Alemán - Minister of Health.
 Analía Núñez - Señorita Panamá 1999.
 María Cordelia Denis - Señorita Panamá World 1987.
 Julian Vergara, manager, Panamá  Hotel.
 Mery Alfaro de Villageliú, socialité.

Contestants 
These are the competitors who have been selected this year.

Election Schedule
 August 7 Press Conference in the salón Zafiro del Hotel Panamá.
Friday September 6 Final night, coronation Señorita Panamá 2002.

Candidates Notes

Stefanie De Roux later competed in the Miss Earth 2006 beauty pageant, held on November 26, 2006 in Manila, Philippines. She came in 5th place.
Yoselin Sánchez Espino was among the boycotting contestants (joined in London) of Miss World 2002. She was Unplaced.
Carolina Miranda represented Panamá in Miss Earth 2002 as Miss Earth Panamá 2002. She was Unplaced.
Karina Goods represented Panamá in Miss Asia Pacific 2002.
Gabriela Alegre Panay is the daughter of Jazmine Panay, Miss Panamá 1974.

References

External links
 
 misspanama.net
 panamacrowns.tk

Señorita Panamá
2002 beauty pageants